Hexagonal is the sixth album by South Korean hip-hop duo Leessang. The album was released on October 6, 2009. The album contains 16 songs.

Track listing

Charts positions
 Album

 Songs

Award
 Cyworld Digital Music Awards Song Of The Month - Girl Unable To Break Up, Boy Unable To Leave (Feat. Jung-in) (헤어지지 못하는 남자, 떠나가지 못하는 여자)

References

2009 albums
Korean-language albums
Leessang albums